Corrinne Wicks (born 26 April 1968) is an English actress, notable for playing Dr. Helen Thompson in the BBC daytime soap opera Doctors, from 2000 to 2005, and Ella Hart in the ITV soap opera Emmerdale, from 2010 to 2011.

Early life
Wicks was born and raised in Cheltenham, Gloucestershire.

Career

Film and television
Wicks started her career in television as a casting assistant on such programmes as Prime Suspect, Dalziel and Pascoe and The Ruth Rendell Mysteries, before switching to an acting career. She trained at the prestigious Webber Douglas Academy of Dramatic Art from 1996 to 1998.

In addition to her appearances for over five years in the daily Doctors, Wicks has also appeared in many other TV shows including  Murder Most Horrid, Harbour Lights, The Bill, Holby City, Grange Hill, Pig Heart Boy, Doc Martin and Life on Mars. She also appeared on the special charity "TV Medics" edition of The Weakest Link in December 2001 finishing in the final 3.

Wicks joined the regular cast of Emmerdale in November 2010 on a nine-month contract as Ella Hart, the ex-wife of Declan Macey. The character of Ella Hart gave Wicks the chance to be more provocative and flirtatious than many of her previous screen credits allowed. In June 2011 the short term contract ended and Wicks's character was written out of the programme when Stuart Blackburn took over as producer. However, the door has been left open for the character's possible return.

Wicks received a Best Actress nomination at the Royal Television Society Awards (RTS) in both 2004 and 2005.

As well as playing her role in Emmerdale for ITV, Wicks acted in the BBC's adaptation of Nigel Slater's best selling memoir Toast (January 2011); she played young Nigel Slater's secondary school teacher. Wicks also had a guest role on Coronation Street in 2019 as gold digger Martine Skelton.

Wicks plays Lolita in a YouTube mocumentary "Jackie & Lotlita" which she co-writes and directs alongside her friend, actress Olga Sosnovska, who plays Jackie.  It is a series of comedy sketches based around the life of two "actresses of a certain age" and is filmed whenever the two can get together (Sosnovska lives in New York).  Wicks and Sosnovska met whilst training at drama school along with Sosnovska's husband Sendhil Ramamurthy, who often lends a hand filming and occasionally appearing briefly in an episode.

From 2021, Wicks had a regular main role as pub landlady Beverley Godwin in the radio soap opera Greenborne opposite John Altman and Louise Jameson. Also in 2021, Wicks appeared alongside Colin Baker in a starring role in the sci-fi film You Might Get Lost, a role for which she won Best Actress Awards at the Miami International Sci-Fi Film Festival and the Berlin International SciFi Film Festival.

Theatre
Wicks' theatre acting credits include Trevor Nunn's production of Harold Pinter's Betrayal at the Royal National Theatre, Our Town, Attempts on Her Life, Six Degrees of Separation and Dinner with the Family.

She completed a UK tour in 2007/09 playing Gwendolyn in Oscar Wilde's The Importance of Being Earnest  that also co-starred her husband Tom Butcher and in 2009/10 toured the UK in "The Holly and The Ivy" playing the drunken and damaged Margaret Gregory. In 2015, she again co-starred with her husband, this time in a touring production of The Ghost Train and in the Francis Durbridge play Murder with Love. Other theatre work includes UK touring productions of The Devil at Midnight (2014), Stone Cold Murder (2015) Death Toll (2016) and Strictly Murder (2017).

She made her debut as a director in 2021 with a new play “Inside The Claypot Rice”

Personal life
Prior to her marriage, Wicks had been engaged 5 times (her first fiancé was in fact her school teacher). Wicks married her Doctors co-star Tom Butcher (PC Loxton in The Bill/Dr Marc Eliot in Doctors) in November 2005. Although happliy married, Wicks did not live with her husband for the first 7 years of marriage: he lived in London, while she continued to live at her home in Birmingham. Amongst other things she is a fully qualified Private Secretary, has had a modelling career, has been a life model at a central London Art School, has worked in the art/props dept at Pinewood Studios working on an Indiana Jones movie and volunteered at a soup kitchen.  She is a self confessed terrible cook even though her father was a chef by trade. She is mildly dyslexic and has always suffered with shyness having been brought up to be "seen and not heard" and never to "show off".

Filmography

Film

Television

Audio

References

External links

1968 births
Living people
English television actresses
English stage actresses
English film actresses
Actresses from Gloucestershire
People from Cheltenham
Alumni of the Webber Douglas Academy of Dramatic Art
20th-century English actresses
21st-century English actresses